Amy Westerman is an American former rugby union player. She played Inside Center, Outside Center, Wing, Flyhalf, and Fullback for the Eagles; Fullback, Inside Center, and Wing for Old Gold RFC, Boston WRFC, Maryland Stingers and Beantown RFC.

She later scored a hat trick against  in their quarter-final encounter.

At the 1998 World Cup, Westerman scored a hat trick and made two conversions against .

Westerman has scored 14 tries in seven Rugby World Cup appearances.

References 

Year of birth missing (living people)
Living people
Female rugby union players
American female rugby union players
United States women's international rugby union players